Ajit Manocha is the president and CEO of SEMI. Headquartered in Milpitas, California, SEMI is the global industry association serving the electronics manufacturing and design supply chain. Manocha, an industry leader, has over 40 years of global experience in the semiconductor industry.

Manocha was formerly CEO at GLOBALFOUNDRIES, and while there he also served as vice chairman and chairman of the Semiconductor Industry Association (SIA). Earlier, Manocha served as EVP of worldwide operations at Spansion. Prior to Spansion, Manocha was EVP and chief manufacturing officer at Philips/NXP Semiconductors. He began his career at AT&T Bell Laboratories as a research scientist where he was granted several patents related to microelectronics manufacturing.

Manocha is active on global advocacy issues, championing electronics advances to improve global innovation, health, safety, talent, and education. Manocha has served on the President's committees for “Advanced Manufacturing Partnerships” and the President's Council of Advisors on Science & Technology (PCAST). In 2020, the Silicon Valley Engineering Council (SVEC) inducted Manocha to be in the Silicon Valley Engineering Hall of Fame for championing industry collaboration, driving manufacturing efficiency and pioneering reactive ion etching, as well as for manufacturing process flows for logic and memory chips that serve as the foundation for modern electronics.

References

External links
http://www.semi.org/en/semi-appoints-ajit-manocha-president-and-ceo

Year of birth missing (living people)
Living people
Indian chief executives
Kansas State University alumni